The mayor of Pittsburgh is the chief executive of the government of the city of Pittsburgh, Pennsylvania, United States, as stipulated by the Charter of the City of Pittsburgh. This article is a listing of past (and present) mayors of Pittsburgh.

Prior to the 1816 city charter, the Borough of Pittsburgh had its council elect a "Chief Burgess" among themselves. After the borough rechartered itself as a city, its first seven "mayors" were selected in a similar fashion as the Chief Burgesses had been under borough council. It was not until Mayor Samuel Pettigrew in the 1830s that general elections of popular vote were conducted among all the city's voters to determine who would hold the mayor's office. Pettigrew was both the last "selected by council" mayor and the first "generally elected" mayor of Pittsburgh. From 1901 to 1903 the state legislature took control of the city on the grounds of corruption by former Mayor William J. Diehl with the passage of the so-called "ripper bill" and appointed the unelected "recorders" Joseph Brown and Adam Brown who were only answerable to the state government. Since 1903, all mayors have been popularly elected. The current mayor, since January 2022, is Democrat Ed Gainey.

Chief Burgesses (1794–1813)

Mayors (1816–present)

† Died in Office; # Resigned from Office ; ♥ still living

Longest tenures
13 years (1946–1959) – David L. Lawrence 
12 years (1994–2006) – Thomas J. Murphy, Jr.
11 years and 1 month (1977–1988) – Richard Caliguiri
10 years and 1 month (1959–1970) – Joseph M. Barr
9 years and 3 months (1936–1946) – Cornelius D. Scully
8 years and 9 months (1909–1914, 1922–1926) – William A. Magee
8 years (2014–2022) – Bill Peduto
7 years and 11 months (1817–1825) – John Darragh
7 years and 4 months (2006–2014) – Luke Ravenstahl
7 years and >3 months (1970–1977) – Peter F. Flaherty
7 years and <3 months (1926–1933) – Charles H. Kline

The listed durations are rounded to the nearest month.

See also
List of mayors of Allegheny, Pennsylvania
Pittsburgh City Council
Pittsburgh Mayoral Chief of Staff

Notes

References

Sources

Office of Prothonotary; Allegheny County, Pennsylvania
Historic Pittsburgh Collection
Political Graveyard: Pittsburgh

External links
Mayors in crisis through history
Pittsburgh mayoral election results
Pittsburgh mayors

 
History of Pittsburgh
Pittsburgh-related lists